

BNT

bTV

Nova TV

Skat TV

Bulgaria on air

TV2

7/8 TV

References 
BNT shows
BTV shows
Nova TV shows

Bulgarian television series